Paruima Airport  is an airport serving the community of Paruima in the Cuyuni-Mazaruni Region of Guyana.

See also

 List of airports in Guyana
 Transport in Guyana

References

External links
Paruima Airport
OpenStreetMap - Paruima
OurAirports - Paruima
HERE/Nokia - Paruima
SkyVector Aeronautical Charts

Airports in Guyana